Ivica Vrdoljak (born 19 September 1983) is a Croatian professional retired footballer.

Club career
Vrdoljak started playing football at his homeclub, Serbian top league club FK Vojvodina, where he played for the youth teams until 1999, when he moved to Zagreb, Croatia, and settled in the youth system of the Croatian top flight side NK Zagreb. After graduating to the senior team he was sent on loans to NK Lučko and the second division team Croatia Sesvete. Vrdoljak had a good season at Croatia Sesvete, scoring four goals and featuring in 22 league matches, and after that he was returned to NK Zagreb. In three seasons at the club he made 81 league appearances and scored three goals. He was then, along with his teammate Mario Mandžukić, transferred to Croatian powerhouse Dinamo Zagreb for a fee of €1 million. Since his arrival, Vrdoljak has established himself as a consistent first-team player. In his debut season for Dinamo he played in twenty-four league matches and bagged three goals. The next season, he was irreplaceable in the midfield and made 29 league appearances by the end of the season and scored three more goals.

During the qualifiers UEFA Champions League 2014-2015 Vrdoljak missed two penalties against Celtic FC. However, Legia won this match 4–1. He retired in 2016 following a knee injury. He briefly returned to football, signing a contract with another Ekstraklasa outfit, Wisła Płock, however after failing to make a single appearance, he decided to ultimately retire.

International career
He is also a former Croatia under-21 international and capped seven times at the under-21 level during the 2004–05 season.

Honours
Dinamo Zagreb
Croatian First League (3): 2007–08, 2008–09, 2009–10
Croatian Cup (2): 2007–08, 2008–09
Legia Warsaw
Ekstraklasa (2): 2012–13, 2013–14
Polish Cup (3): 2010–11, 2011–12, 2012–13

Career statistics

References

External links
 

Profile at Nogometni Magazin 

1983 births
Living people
Footballers from Novi Sad
Croats of Vojvodina
Naturalized citizens of Croatia
Serbian emigrants to Croatia
Association football central defenders
Croatian footballers
Croatia under-21 international footballers
NK Zagreb players
NK Lučko players
NK Croatia Sesvete players
GNK Dinamo Zagreb players
Legia Warsaw players
Wisła Płock players
[[First Football League (Croatia) players]]
Croatian Football League players
Ekstraklasa players
Croatian expatriate footballers
Expatriate footballers in Poland
Croatian expatriate sportspeople in Poland